The 2010 UCI World Ranking was the second edition of the ranking system launched by the Union Cycliste Internationale (UCI) in 2009; the following year it would be merged with the UCI ProTour to form the UCI World Tour. The series started with the Tour Down Under's opening stage on 19 January, and consisted of 13 stage races and 13 one-day races, culminating in the Giro di Lombardia on 16 October.  Two new races, the Grand Prix Cycliste de Québec and the Grand Prix Cycliste de Montréal were added to the ProTour series, and consequently to the ranking schedule. These two Canadian events, and the Tour Down Under, were the only races in the series to take place outside Europe.

Events
All 16 events of the 2010 UCI ProTour were included in the series calendar, along with the three Grand Tours, two early season stage races, and five one-day classics.

†: Riders promoted after removal of the results of Alejandro Valverde or (in the Tour de France) of Alberto Contador

Final standings
Source:

On 31 May, the UCI annulled all results obtained by then rankings leader Alejandro Valverde, and removed his points, as he received a suspension due to his involvement in the Operación Puerto doping case.  The two-year suspension was in part retroactive, dating from 1 January 2010.  His points were also removed from his team, and the Spanish national score, both of which had previously been at the top of their rankings.  Valverde's points for final position were reallocated: his points gained in individual stages of stage races were deleted.

In February 2012, Alberto Contador had all his results from the 2010 Tour de France annulled, and these points were retrospectively reallocated in the 2010 rankings.  Contador dropped from second place to thirteenth as a result.

Individual

 278 riders scored at least one point. Additionally, Marek Rutkiewicz of the Polish selection finished 7th overall in the Tour de Pologne, which would have earned 30 points, but as a member of a national selection rather than a UCI registered team, he was not eligible for points.

Team
Team rankings are calculated by adding the ranking points of the top five riders of a team in the table.  Teams with the same number of points are ranked according to their top-ranked rider.

It had been said that the top 17 teams at the end of the season would be guaranteed a place in the three Grand Tours in 2011, although with one race remaining, the UCI announced the launch of the WorldTour, meaning that teams of ProTour status would have the right to participate in all ranking events in 2011, including the Grand Tours, regardless of position in this table. , despite finishing 17th, were not granted a place in the 2011 Tour de France.

 32 teams scored at least one point.

Nation
National rankings are calculated by adding the ranking points of the top five riders registered in a nation in the table. Nations with the same number of points are ranked according to their top-ranked rider.  The top ten nations as of 15 August were permitted up to nine riders at the 2010 UCI Road World Championships in Australia in October.

Riders from 34 nations earned at least one point.

Leader progress

References

 
UCI World Ranking
UCI World Tour